Abdul Karim al-Shaikhly (28 April 1937 – 1980), was an Iraqi politician, diplomat and minister. Al-Shaikhly served as Minister of Foreign Affairs from 31 July 1968 to 29 September 1971 and  Iraq's Permanent Representative to the United Nations from 1972 to 1974. The Iraqi security forces arrested him and he stayed there about two years before the Iraqi security forces released him in 1980. The Iraqi Intelligence Service assassinated al-Shaikhly on April 8, 1980 in Baghdad.Coming from an aristocratic family, he was a cousin and classmate of Saddam Hussein and it is believed Saddam used his birthday as his own.

References

1937 births
1980 deaths
Government ministers of Iraq
Foreign ministers of Iraq
Iraqi diplomats